Edouard Frank Filliol (16 December 1895 – 19 March 1955) was a Swiss ice hockey player who competed in the 1924 Winter Olympics.

In 1924 he participated with the Swiss ice hockey team in the Winter Olympics tournament.

See also
List of Olympic men's ice hockey players for Switzerland

References

External links

1895 births
1955 deaths
Genève-Servette HC players
Ice hockey players at the 1924 Winter Olympics
Olympic ice hockey players of Switzerland
Swiss ice hockey goaltenders